Pteroplatini is a tribe of beetles in the subfamily Cerambycinae, containing the following genera:

 Aphylax
 Corynellus
 Deltosoma
 Nubosoplatus
 Pteroplatus
 Thelgetra

References

 
Cerambycinae